This list enumerates railway lines in Vietnam. The Vietnamese railway system is owned and primarily operated by the state-owned Vietnam Railways, although private railway companies also offer special service to key destinations. Its principal route is the  single track North–South Railway line running between Hanoi and Ho Chi Minh City; as of 2007, 85% of the network's passenger volume and 60% of its cargo volume is transported along this line. Besides this one, the system includes lines connecting Hanoi to the People's Republic of China, to surrounding cities such as Thái Nguyên, Hai Phong and Hạ Long.

Most existing Vietnamese railway lines use metre gauge, although standard gauge (used in China) and mixed gauge are used northeast of Hanoi. As of 2005, there were 278 stations on the Vietnamese railway network, 191 of which are located along the North-South Railway line.

Other proposals aim to restore or completely rebuild previously existing lines that fell into disuse after the French Indochina War and the Vietnam War, such as the Da Lat–Thap Cham line, which now serves only to ferry tourists between Đà Lạt and the nearby village of Trại Mát. International links to Cambodia and Laos are also under consideration.

Current lines

Proposed lines 
Several railway lines have been proposed for construction in Vietnam in recent years. The largest such project is the high-speed North–South express railway connecting Ha Noi and Ho Chi Minh City, valued at approximately US$56 billion. Due to its cost, plans for the line are currently on hold pending further study of the project. Other projects involve the restoration of previously existing lines, such as the Da Lat–Tháp Chàm line and the Ho Chi Minh City–Lộc Ninh, both of which were originally built in the 1930s, but fell into disuse after decades of war. The Ho Chi Minh City–Loc Ninh line, along with a new Mu Gia–Vung Ang line, would permit new international railway links to Cambodia and Laos, respectively.

Defunct lines

See also 
Rail transport in Vietnam
Transport in Vietnam

Notes and references
Notes

References

Bibliography

External links
 Official Website of Vietnam Railways
 Ministry of Transport, Vietnam

Vietnam
 
Railway lines